Albertina Soepboer (born December 3, 1969) is a Dutch writer writing in both Frisian and Dutch.

She was born in Holwerd and studied Romance languages and cultures and then Frisian literature in Groningen. Soepboer has written plays for the Theater De Citadel in Groningen.

Selected works 
 It nachtlân/Het nachtland (The Night Country), poetry in West Frisian (1998) 
 De stobbewylch (The Pollard Willow), poetry in West Frisian (2000)
 De fjoerbidders (The Fire Worshippers), poetry (2003)

References 

1969 births
Living people
Dutch women poets
West Frisian-language writers
People from Dongeradeel